Borden Generating Station is a natural diesel oil power station owned by  Maritime Electric, in Borden-Carleton, Prince Edward Island.  The plant is primarily used during periods of peak demand or when the power supply from the mainline is impaired.

References

Oil-fired power stations in Prince Edward Island